The following is a list of notable deaths in February 2013.

Entries for each day are listed alphabetically by surname. A typical entry lists information in the following sequence:
Name, age, country of citizenship and reason for notability, established cause of death, reference.

February 2013

1
Barney, 12, American Scottish Terrier, First Dog of President George W. Bush (2001–2009), lymphoma.
Gertrude Berman, 88, American politician.
Rudolf Dašek, 79, Czech guitarist.
Carol Brewster, 85, American actress (Untamed Women, Cat-Woman of the Moon, The Barkleys of Broadway) and model.
Gisèle Guillemot, 90, French writer and a member of the French Resistance.
Helene Hale, 94, American politician, Member of the Hawaii House of Representatives (2000–2006).
John Hamber, 81, United States Virgin Islands Olympic sailor.
Rocky Harris, 80, Australian cricket umpire.
Sir Paul Holmes, 62, New Zealand broadcaster, prostate cancer and heart problems.
Ed Koch, 88, American politician, U.S. Representative from New York (1969–1977), Mayor of New York City (1978–1989), television judge (The People's Court), heart failure.
 Shanu Lahiri, 85, Indian painter.
Bert Long, Jr., 72, American chef, painter, photographer and sculptor, pancreatic cancer.
Louis Luyt, 80, South African rugby union administrator and politician.
Tony Palomo, 81, American Guamanian politician, historian and journalist.
Robin Sachs, 61, English actor (Buffy the Vampire Slayer, Galaxy Quest, Babylon 5), heart attack.
Dag Schjelderup-Ebbe, 86, Norwegian musicologist and composer. 
Milan Vápenka, 69, Czech Olympic volleyball player.
Vladimir Yengibaryan, 80, Armenian light welterweight boxer, Olympic gold medallist (1956) for the Soviet Union.

2
Arlene Ackerman, 66, American educator and public schools superintendent, pancreatic cancer.
Michael D. Cohen, 67, American academic.
Winston Derrick, 62, Antiguan journalist.
Edith Houghton, 100, American baseball player and scout, first female scout in Major League Baseball.
Abraham Iyambo, 52, Namibian politician, Minister of the Fisheries and Marine Resources (1997–2010); Minister of Education (since 2010), stroke.
John Kerr, 81, American actor (South Pacific, The Streets of San Francisco).
Chris Kyle, 38, American author and Navy SEAL sniper, most lethal in U.S. military history, shooting.
Sirajul Haq Memon, 79, Pakistani author, journalist and scholar, cardiac arrest.
Necdet Menzir, 68, Turkish bureaucrat and politician, Minister of Transport (1997–1998), respiratory failure.
Lino Oviedo, 69, Paraguayan politician and general, 2008; 2013 presidential candidate; leader of the National Union of Ethical Citizens, helicopter crash.
Pepper Paire, 88, American AAGPBL baseball player, inspiration for A League of Their Own.
Tarjei Rygnestad, 58, Norwegian physician.
P. Shanmugam, 85, Indian politician, Chief Minister of Puducherry (2000–2001), head injuries from  a fall.
Jack Singer, 95, Canadian businessman and philanthropist.
Frank Stirrup, 88, English rugby league player.
Walt Sweeney, 71, American football player (San Diego Chargers), pancreatic cancer.
Kenneth W. Thompson, 91, American academic.
Guy F. Tozzoli, 90, American architect, lead designer of the World Trade Center.

3
Wolfgang Abraham, 71, German footballer.
Jadin Bell, 15, American bullying victim, suicide.
B. H. Born, 80, American basketball player (University of Kansas).
Cardiss Collins, 81, American politician, member of the U.S. House of Representatives from Illinois (1973–1997).
John Michael D'Arcy, 80, American Roman Catholic prelate, Bishop of Fort Wayne-South Bend (1985–2009), lung and brain cancer.
Steve Demeter, 78, American baseball player (Detroit Tigers, Cleveland Indians), heart disease.
*Deng Wei, 53, Chinese photographer.
Matija Duh, 23, Slovenian speedway rider, head injuries.
Joseph Egerega, 72, Nigerian Roman Catholic prelate, Apostolic Vicar of Bomadi (1997–2009).
Luigi Falco, 61, Italian politician and doctor.
Oscar Feltsman, 91, Russian composer.
Peter Gilmore, 81, British actor (The Onedin Line, Carry On, Doctor Who).
Ragnar Heurlin, 84, Swedish Olympic sprint canoer.
*Ichikawa Danjūrō XII, 66, Japanese Kabuki actor, pneumonia.
James Muri, 93, American World War II pilot.
David Oates, 50, British sports commentator (BBC Sport).
Zlatko Papec, 79, Croatian footballer.
Ignace Baguibassa Sambar-Talkena, 77, Togolese Roman Catholic prelate, Bishop of Kara (1996–2009).
Mike Schwartz, 63, American anti-abortion activist, ALS.
Kåre Syrstad, 73, Norwegian farmers' union leader.
Robert Anthony Welch, 65, Irish author and academic, cancer.
Jam Mohammad Yousaf, 58, Pakistani politician, Chief Minister of Balochistan (2002–2007), cardiac arrest.

4
Kaarina Autio, 71, Finnish Olympic gymnast.
Dirk Ballendorf, 73, American-born Guamanian historian. 
Donald Byrd, 80, American jazz trumpeter.
Darlan, 5, British Thoroughbred racehorse, injuries sustained during a race.
Margaret Frazer, 66, American historical novelist, breast cancer.
Joe C. Gardner, 68, American politician, member of the Mississippi House of Representatives (since 2007).
Richard E. Geis, 85, American science fiction writer.
Des Raj Goyal, 83–84, Indian journalist, academic and author.
Pat Halcox, 82, British jazz trumpeter.
*John Baptist Liu Jingshan, 99, Chinese Roman Catholic prelate, Bishop of Ningxia (1984–2009).
Anthony Legge, 73, British archaeologist and academic.
M. Bhanumathi, 66–67, Indian stage and film actress.
Leonard Marsak, 88–89, American scholar.
Achilla Orru, 53, Ugandan musician, heart disease.
Theresia van der Pant, 88, Dutch sculptor (Equestrian statue of Queen Wilhelmina).
Vernon Robert Pearson, 89, American jurist, Washington Supreme Court Chief Justice (1981–1989), hip surgery complications.
John M. Peters, 86, American politician, member of the Iowa House of Representatives (1953–1955).
Reg Presley, 71, British singer (The Troggs) and songwriter ("Love Is All Around"), lung cancer.
Mohammad Ali Shah, 66, Pakistani surgeon and politician, Sindh Minister of Sports, heart attack.
Stewie, 7–8, world's longest domestic cat, cancer.
P. W. Underwood, 81, American football coach (Southern Mississippi).
Essie Mae Washington-Williams, 87, American schoolteacher.

5
Antonino Dos Santos Baptista, 79, Portuguese cyclist.
Nel Büch, 81, Dutch Olympic sprinter (1952).
Stuart Freeborn, 98, English make-up artist (Star Wars, 2001: A Space Odyssey, Superman).
Reinaldo Gargano, 78, Uruguayan politician, Senator (1985–2005, 2008–2010), Minister of Foreign Affairs (2008–2010), heart failure.
Harrison T. Groutage, 87, American painter and educator.
Gerry Hambling, 86, English film editor (Pink Floyd – The Wall, Midnight Express, In the Name of the Father).
Egil Hovland, 88, Norwegian composer.
Paul Gordon Jarvis, 77, British ecologist.
Kenneth Jernstedt, 95, American fighter pilot.
Charles Longbottom, 82, British politician, MP for York (1959–1966).
Tom McGuigan, 91, New Zealand politician, MP for Lyttelton (1969–1975).
Marshall Miles, 86, American bridge player and author, complications from a heart attack.
Leda Mileva, 93, Bulgarian writer, translator and diplomat.
Marguerite Perrou, 96, French Olympian 
Bazy Tankersley, 91, American newspaper publisher and horse breeder.
Paul Tanner, 95, American trombonist, last surviving member of the Glenn Miller Orchestra, complications from pneumonia.
Adrianus Taroreh, 46, Indonesian Olympic boxer.
Shelby Whitfield, 77, American sports announcer and author.
Klaus Wyrtki, 87, American oceanographer.
Derek Yalden, 72, British zoologist.

6
Ronnie Allen, 74, American pool player.
Chokri Belaid, 48, Tunisian politician, assassination by shooting.
Menachem Elon, 89, Israeli jurist, justice on the Supreme Court (1977–1993).
Arthé Guimond, 81, Canadian Roman Catholic prelate, Archbishop of Grouard-McLennan (2000–2006).
Joseph Madec, 89, French Roman Catholic prelate, Bishop of Fréjus-Toulon (1983–2000).
Alden Mason, 93, American artist.
Mo-Do, 46, Italian musician ("Eins, Zwei, Polizei"), suicide.
Walter Nowick, 87, American teacher of Rinzai Zen.
Ira Rubin, 82, American professional bridge player.
Yahya Sulong, 84, Malaysian comedian and actor.
Betty Twarog, 85, American biochemist.
René Vestri, 74, French politician, Senator for Alpes-Maritimes (since 2008) and Mayor of Saint-Jean-Cap-Ferrat (since 2002). 
Adrián Villagómez García, 61, Mexican politician, MP for Nuevo León (2003–2006).
Douglas Warren, 93, Australian Roman Catholic prelate, Bishop of Wilcannia-Forbes (1967–1994).

7
William Anthony Hughes, 91, American Roman Catholic prelate, Bishop of Covington (1979–1995).
L. Brent Kington, 78, American blacksmith and educator.
Nic Knudtzon, 90, Norwegian telecommunications engineer.
Howard Lassoff, 57, American and Israeli basketball player (Maccabi Tel Aviv). 
Like-A-Butterfly, 18, Irish Thoroughbred racehorse and broodmare, colic.
John Livermore, 94, American geologist. 
Niki Marangou, 65, Cypriot writer and painter, traffic collision.
José Moustache, 80, Guadeloupean politician, President of the Regional Council (1983–1986).
Amedeus Msarikie, 81, Tanzanian Roman Catholic prelate, Bishop of Moshi (1986–2007).
K. K. Nair, 82, Indian politician.
Aki Orr, 81, German–born Israeli politician and writer.
Krsto Papić, 79, Croatian screenwriter and film director (My Uncle's Legacy).
Peter Steen, 77, Danish actor.
Elvi Svendsen, 93, Danish Olympic swimmer.
József Tóth, 72, Hungarian geographer and academic, rector of the University of Pécs.
Jürgen Untermann, 84, German linguist.

8
Elizabeth Alley, 58, American actress (Sunset Beach), brain aneurysm.
Sam Boaz, 95, American politician, member of Tennessee House of Representatives (1963–1967).
Ralph Braun, 72, American businessman, founder and CEO of Braun Corporation.
Chris Brinker, 42, American producer (The Boondock Saints) and director, aortic aneurysm.
Giovanni Cheli, 94, Italian Roman Catholic cardinal, Permanent Observer of the Holy See to the United Nations (1973–1986), natural causes.
Claude Covassi, 42, Swiss criminal and spy, drug overdose.
James DePreist, 76, American conductor, complications from heart attack.
Herbert C. Dessauer, 91, American biochemist.
Maureen Dragone, 93, American journalist and author.
Jan Ellis, 71, South African rugby player, cancer.
Ron Hansell, 82, English footballer.
Kjell Hjertsson, 90, Swedish footballer.
*Marjorie Housepian Dobkin, 90, American academic and author.
Patricia Hughes, 90, British radio announcer.
K. Daniel Haley, 83, American politician, member of the New York State Assembly (1971–1976).
György Kézdy, 76, Hungarian actor.
Lyle Lahey, 81, American political cartoonist. 
Ian Lister, 66, Scottish footballer (Aberdeen, Dunfermline Athletic).
Joseph Ma Xue-sheng, 89, Chinese Roman Catholic prelate, Bishop of Zhoucun (since 1997).
Mervyn McCord, 83, British army officer.
Des McGovern, 84, Australian rugby league footballer.
Jack Dale Mengenen, 91, Australian indigenous artist.
Motsapi Moorosi, 67, Lesotho Olympic sprinter.
John Morris, 76, Australian politician, Senator for New South Wales (1985–1990).
Knut Nesbø, 51, Norwegian footballer (Molde, Lyn, Stabæk), guitarist (Di Derre) and sports reporter, cancer.
Funmilola Ogundana, 32, Nigerian sprinter, died while giving birth.
Renato Olivieri, 87, Italian giallo novelist.
Rushdi Said, 92, Egyptian geologist.
Dieter Schütte, 89, German publisher (M. DuMont Schauberg).
Nevin S. Scrimshaw, 95, American nutritionist.
Yodtong Senanan, 75, Thai Muay Thai master and trainer.
Alan Sharp, 79, Scottish screenwriter (Rob Roy, Night Moves).
Bill Smith, 88, American Olympic swimmer.
Alfred Sosgórnik, 79, Polish Olympic athlete.
Jim Sweeney, 83, American football coach (Fresno State).
Elvie Villasanta, 85, Filipino comedian (Mommy Elvie's Problematic Show), breast cancer.

9
Richard Artschwager, 89, American painter, sculptor and illustrator, stroke.
Robert Ashton, 88, British historian.
Gérard Asselin, 62, Canadian politician, MP for Charlevoix (1993–2004) and Manicouagan (2004–2011).
Mike Banks, 90, British mountaineer and Royal Marines officer.
Enar Edberg, 76, Swedish Olympic weightlifter.
Bremer Ehrler, 98, American politician, Secretary of State of Kentucky (1988–1992). 
Keiko Fukuda, 99, Japanese-born American martial artist.
Afzal Guru, 43, Indian Islamist terrorist (2001 Indian Parliament attack), execution by hanging.
H. Palmer Hall, 70, American poet, fiction writer, essayist, editor, and librarian.
Bill Irwin, 92, Canadian Olympic skier.  
Miles J. Jones, 60, American forensic pathologist.
Colin Laverty, 75, Australian doctor and art collector.
Mark Linz, 77, German publisher.
Leonardo Polo, 87, Spanish philosopher. 
Phil Remington, 92, American motorsports engineer.
Jimmy Smyth, 82, Irish hurler (Clare).
Richard Twiss, 58, American educator and author, heart attack. 
Kåre Valebrokk, 72, Norwegian journalist, editor and television executive (TV 2).

10
Cornelis Bas, 85, Dutch mycologist.
W. Watts Biggers, 85, American novelist, creator of Underdog.
Sara Braverman, 95, Romanian-born Israeli Jewish Parachutists of Mandate Palestine member, co-founder of the IDF Women's Corps.
Marianne Brenton, 79, American politician, member of the Massachusetts House of Representatives (1992–1998).
Pery Burge, 57, English artist, cancer.
Marie-Pierre Castel, 64, French actress (The Nude Vampire, The Shiver of the Vampires, Requiem for a Vampire).
Norman Crowder, 86, English priest, Archdeacon of Portsmouth (1985–1993).
Frank Farrelly, 81, American psychologist.
Baron Fielakepa, 51, Tongan government minister.
Sir John Gilmour, 4th Baronet, 68, British soldier and aristocrat. 
David Hartman, 81, American-born Israeli rabbi and philosopher.
Boris Jacobson, 75, Swedish Olympic sailor.
Lolong, Filipino-born saltwater crocodile, largest in captivity, pneumonia and cardiac arrest.
Bill Roost, 88, English footballer (Bristol Rovers).
Thierry Rupert, 35, French basketball player, complications of a heart attack.
Jake Thies, 86, American baseball player (Pittsburgh Pirates).
Eugenio Trías Sagnier, 70, Spanish philosopher.
Ikuzo Sakurai, 68, Japanese politician.
Petro Vlahos, 96, American visual effects inventor and designer.
Zhuang Zedong, 72, Chinese table tennis player, involved in ping-pong diplomacy.

11
Tom Aspell, 62, New Zealand-born American foreign correspondent (NBC News), lung cancer.
Jim Boatwright, 61, American basketball player (Maccabi Tel Aviv), liver cancer.
Oswaldo Brenes Álvarez, 70, Costa Rican Roman Catholic prelate, Bishop of Ciudad Quesada (2008–2012).
Esther Buckley, 64, American educator, member of the United States Commission on Civil Rights (1983–1992), traffic collision.
Wayne Chernecki, 63, Canadian ice hockey player and businessman, lung cancer.
Mark Dalby, 75, British prelate, Archdeacon of Rochdale (1991–2000).
Kelefa Diallo, 53, Guinean general, Army chief of staff, plane crash.
William R. Eadington, 67, American economist.
Jack Eskridge, 89, American professional basketball player.
Kevin Gray, 55, American musical theatre actor (The Phantom of the Opera, The King and I), heart attack.
Yasuko Hatoyama, 90, Japanese political financier, MODS.
Richard Hill, 7th Baron Sandys, 81, British peer and landowner.
Rick Huxley, 72, English musician (The Dave Clark Five).
Vi Lloyd, 89, Australian politician, member of the New South Wales Legislative Council (1973–1981).
Teodor Lucuță, 57, Romanian footballer (Dinamo București), stroke and heart failure.
William D. Metz, 98, American historian. 
Krzysztof Michalski, 64, Polish philosopher. 
Kevin Peek, 66, Australian musician (Sky), melanoma.
Erik Quistgaard, 91, Danish engineer, director general of the European Space Agency (1980–1984).
Mark Scott, 89, British rower.
Brooke E. Sheldon, 81, American librarian.
Zoe Țapu, 78, Romanian agronomist.
Chrysler Thomas, 78, Grenadian politician, MP and Minister of Agriculture (1973–1979).
Rem Viakhirev, 78, Russian businessman, Chairman of Gazprom (1992–2001).
Pavlo Vigderhaus, 87, Ukrainian architect.
D. Vinayachandran, 66, Indian Malayalam poet.
Matthew White, 55, American basketball player (University of Pennsylvania), stabbing.
Alfred Zijai, 52, Albanian footballer (Flamurtari Vlorë).

12
Sattam bin Abdulaziz Al Saud, 72, Saudi royal, Governor of Riyadh Province (since 2011). 
Bill Bell, 81, English businessman, Chairman of Port Vale F.C. (1987–2002).
Marion Bryden, 94, Canadian politician, MPP of the Legislative Assembly of Ontario for Beaches—Woodbine (1975–1990).
Barnaby Conrad, 90, American author, heart failure.
Mal Couch, 74, American theologian. 
Christopher Dorner, 33, American murderer, suicide by gunshot.
Bobby Gore, 76, American gang leader and activist.
Brian Langford, 77, English cricketer (Somerset).
Jimmy Mulroy, 72, Irish Gaelic football player and manager, member of the Seanad Éireann (1987–1989).
Richard Orton, 72, British composer and academic.
C. R. Krishnaswamy Rao, 86, Indian civil servant.
Kurt Redel, 94, German musician and conductor.
Rita Ridley, 66, British middle-distance runner and Commonwealth Games gold medallist, cancer.
Frank Seator, 37, Liberian footballer.
Tarmizi Taher, 76, Indonesian naval officer and politician, Minister of Religious Affairs (1993–1998).
Yasushi Takahashi, 88, Japanese theoretical physicist.
Reginald Turnill, 97, British aerospace correspondent (BBC), heart failure.
Jim Tysinger, 91, American politician, member of the Georgia Senate (1969–1998), pneumonia.
Hennadiy Udovenko, 81, Ukrainian politician, Minister for Foreign Affairs (1994–1998), President of the United Nations General Assembly (1997–1998).

13
John Ammonds, 88, British television producer.
Gabriele Basilico, 68, Italian photographer, cancer.
Paul Benzaquin, 90, American broadcaster.
Gerry Day, 91, American screenwriter (The Black Hole, Dennis the Menace).
George Finch, 82, British architect.
Izya Gershtein, 89, Kyrgyzstani film director.
John Holt, 53, American football player (Tampa Bay Buccaneers, Indianapolis Colts).
Pieter Kooijmans, 79, Dutch jurist, diplomat and politician, Minister of Foreign Affairs (1993–1994), Minister of State (since 2007).
Oswald LeWinter, 81, Austrian-born American writer.
David Lister, 82, British origami historian.
Andrée Malebranche, 96,  Afro-Haitian painter and art instructor.
Harry Miller, 86, American college basketball coach (Fresno State, Wichita State, Stephen F. Austin).
Mos, 58, Burmese comedian and actor, liver disease.
Ove Nilsson, 84, Swedish Olympic rower.
William T. Randall, 97, American Negro league baseball player.
Don Scott, 84, British Olympic silver-medalist boxer (1948), Parkinson's disease.
Robert Senelle, 94, Belgian academic and constitutionalist. 
Yuko Tojo, 73, Japanese political activist, interstitial pneumonia.
Ivan Večenaj, 92, Croatian painter.
Stefan Wigger, 80, German television actor.
Georges Wohlfart, 62, Luxembourgian politician, Minister for Health (1998–1999).
Tibor Zsíros, 82, Hungarian Olympic basketball player and coach.

14
Glenn Boyer, 89, American author and Wyatt Earp historian.
Mary Brave Bird, 58, American Lakota writer and activist. 
Richard J. Collins, 98, American screenwriter (Bonanza, Matlock). 
Luis Cruzado, 71, Peruvian footballer (Universitario). 
Frank DiPaolo, 106, American political figure and restaurateur.
Ronald Dworkin, 81, American philosopher and legal scholar, leukemia.
Walt Easley, 55, American football player (San Francisco 49ers).
Glynn Gregory, 73, American football player.
Aleksander Gudzowaty, 74, Polish businessman and economist.
Goldie Harvey, 29, Nigerian R&B and pop singer and television personality, intracerebral hemorrhage.
Mark Kamins, 57, American disc jockey, discovered Madonna, heart failure.
Sir Montague Levine, 90, British coroner and physician.
Fernando Lyra, 74, Brazilian politician, Minister of Justice (1985–1986), cardiopathy.
Shadow Morton, 72, American songwriter ("Leader of the Pack") and record producer (The Shangri-Las, Vanilla Fudge), cancer.
Kenneth Nance, 71, American politician, member of the Oklahoma House of Representatives (1968–1978), lung infection.
Friedrich Neznansky, 80, Russian writer.
Peter Olver, 95, British World War II fighter ace.
T. L. Osborn, 89, American televangelist and author.
Glenn Snyder, 88, American author and political scientist.
Reeva Steenkamp, 29, South African model, shot.
*Tim Dog, 46, American rapper, complications of diabetes.
Kazuo Tsunoda, 94, Japanese fighter pilot.
Kimberly Walker, American soldier, strangled.
Zdeněk Zikán, 75, Czech footballer.

15
Hector Catling, 88, British archaeologist.
Cummin Clancy, 90, Irish Olympic discus thrower and businessman.
Kenneth Dement, 80, American attorney, College Football Hall of Fame player, Southeast Missouri State University Board of Regents president.
Pat Derby, 70, British–born American animal trainer, throat cancer.
Alain Desrosières, 72, French statistician.
Ian Fowler, 73, British journalist (Manchester Evening News), first person to link Moors Murders, Parkinson's disease.
Giovanni Narcis Hakkenberg, 89, Dutch Sea-lieutenant of the Royal Dutch Marines, decorated war hero and knight of the Military Order of William.
Earle Howard, 86, American politician, member of the Indiana House of Representatives (1986–1994).
Carmelo Imbriani, 37, Italian football player (S.S.C. Napoli, Genoa C.F.C.) and manager (Benevento Calcio), lymphoma.
Sanan Kachornprasart, 77, Thai general and politician, Deputy Prime Minister (1990, 1998–2000, 2008–2011), blood infection.
Ivan Kazanets, 94, Ukrainian politician, Chairman of the Council of Ministers of the Ukrainian SSR (1963–1965); Minister of Ferrous Metallurgy of the Soviet Union. 
Todor Kolev, 73, Bulgarian actor (The Goat Horn, The Hare Census, Toplo, King for a Day, Opasen char), lung cancer.
John A. MacNaughton, 67, Canadian financier and executive, Hodgkin's lymphoma.
Bill Morrison, 84, Australian politician, federal MP for St George (1969–1975, 1980–1984), Minister for Defence (1975).
Dattaji Nalawade, 77, Indian politician, Speaker of the Maharashtra Legislative Assembly (1995–1999).
Alberto Nogar, 78, Filipo weightlifter, natural causes.
Tony Speller, 83, British politician, MP for North Devon (1979–1992).
Bill Steltemeier, 83, American executive, President (1980–2000), CEO (2000–2009), and Chairman (2000–2013) of Eternal Word Television Network.
Branford Taitt, 74, Barbadian politician, Minister of Foreign Affairs (1993–1994), President of the Senate (2008–2012).
Alan Tottoh, 68, British Olympic boxer.
Alberto Valtierra, 81, Spanish Olympic rower.

16
John Ayldon, 69, British opera singer.
Claudette Boyer, 75, Canadian politician, member of the Legislative Assembly of Ontario for Ottawa—Vanier (1999–2003), intracranial hemorrhage.
Ken Clark, 46, American football player (Indianapolis Colts, Nebraska Cornhuskers), heart attack.
Jan Dahm, 91, Norwegian World War II resistance member.
Benjamin Dy, 60, Filipino politician, Governor of Isabela (1992–2001), emphysema.
Colin Edwards, 21, Guyanese footballer, traffic collision.
Eric Ericson, 94, Swedish choral conductor and teacher.
Ken Gill, 80,  British Anglican bishop, Bishop of Central Karnataka (South India; 1972–1980) and Assistant Bishop of Newcastle (England, 1980–1998).
Ennio Girolami, 78, Italian actor.
Jesús Ramón Martínez de Ezquerecocha Suso, 77, Spanish-born Ecuadorian Roman Catholic prelate, Bishop of Babahoyo (1994–2008).
Les McNichol, 80, New Zealand rugby league player.
Grigory Pomerants, 94, Russian philosopher and cultural theorist.
Paul Rice, 64, English cricketer.
Edwin Russell, 73, English sculptor.
Tony Sheridan, 72, English rock and roll singer, early collaborator with The Beatles.
Harald Siepermann, 50, German animator (Tarzan, Who Framed Roger Rabbit, Enchanted), cancer.
Ernie Vossler, 84, American professional golfer and course designer, dementia.
Markus Zürcher, 66, Swiss artist.

17
Francis J. Aguilar, 80, American business academic.
Derek Batey, 84, English quiz show host (Mr. & Mrs.).
William Bridges, 79, American author and business consultant, complications of Lewy body disease.
Richard Briers, 79, British actor (The Good Life, Ever Decreasing Circles, Peter Pan), emphysema.
Manoranjan Das, 89, Indian playwright.
Debbie Ford, 57, American author, cancer.
André Gingras, 46, Canadian dancer and choreographer, cancer.
Milan Gvero, 75, Bosnian Serb general (Army of Republika Srpska).
Phil Henderson, 44, American basketball player (Duke University).
Shmulik Kraus, 77, Israeli actor and pop rock singer, swine influenza.
Sophie Kurys, 87, American baseball player (Racine Belles), complications from surgery.
Tony Lorick, 71, American football player (Baltimore Colts, New Orleans Saints).
Georg Luck, 87, Swiss academic.
Mindy McCready, 37, American country music singer (Ten Thousand Angels), suicide by gunshot.
Luis Paulino Mora Mora, 68, Costa Rican jurist, President of the Supreme Court of Justice of Costa Rica (since 1999), pneumonia and diabetes.
*Seán Óg Ó Ceallacháin, 89, Irish sports broadcaster.
Louis Spadia, 92, American football executive, founder of the Bay Area Sports Hall of Fame.
Maretta Taylor, 78, American politician, member of the Georgia House of Representatives (1990–2002).
Mike Westhues, 64, American singer-songwriter and guitarist. 
David Whitehouse, 71, British-born American museum executive (The Corning Museum of Glass), cancer.

18
Ahmadullah Affandi, 90, Indian scout leader and footballer.
Kevin Ayers, 68, English psychedelic rock songwriter and musician (Soft Machine, Wilde Flowers).
Otto Beisheim, 89, German billionaire businessman, founder of Metro AG, suicide.
Kevin Black, 69, New Zealand radio broadcaster, suspected heart attack.
Jerry Buss, 80, American entrepreneur, owner of the Los Angeles Lakers, cancer and kidney failure.
Alger Chapman, Jr., 81, American finance executive, CEO and Chairman of the Chicago Board Options Exchange (1986–1997), heart failure.
 Chu Hsing-yu, 56, Taiwanese politician, MLY (1993–2005), heart attack.
Elspet Gray, Baroness Rix, 83, Scottish actress and philanthropist.
Damon Harris, 62, American soul and R&B singer (The Temptations), prostate cancer.
Godfrey Hewitt, 73, British evolutionary geneticist.
Chieko Honda, 49, Japanese voice actress (Mobile Suit Gundam ZZ, Here is Greenwood), cancer.
James Irvine, 54, British furniture designer.
Okey Isima, 56, Nigerian Olympic footballer.
Igal Lichtman, American technology chief executive, cancer.
Anthony Theodore Lobo, 75, Pakistani Roman Catholic prelate, Bishop of Islamabad-Rawalpindi (1993–2010).
Matt Mattox, 91, American jazz and ballet teacher.
Craig McKinley, 48, Canadian physician and aquanaut (NEEMO 7 mission).
Gustaf Adolf Neumann, 88, Austrian journalist. 
Mikhail Pakhomov, 36, Russian politician.
Otfried Preußler, 89, German children's book author (The Robber Hotzenplotz). (German) 
Qian Haiyan, 57, Chinese civil servant and diplomat, cancer.
Shayle R. Searle, 84, New Zealand-born American statistician, cancer.
Joel Silberg, 85, Israeli director and screenwriter.
Pep Simek, 86, American businessman, founder of Tombstone pizza.
Alan Westin, 83, American academic, cancer.
Hugh E. Wild, 94, American air force general.
Martin Zweig, 70, American financier.

19
Armen Alchian, 98, American economist.
Pete D. Anderson, 81, American jockey and racehorse trainer.
George Aratani, 95, American entrepreneur (Mikasa, Kenwood) and philanthropist, complications of pneumonia.
Ardyce Bohlke, 69, American politician, member of the Nebraska Legislature (1991–2000), brain tumor.
John Brascia, 80, American dancer (White Christmas, Meet Me in Las Vegas), Parkinson's disease.
Joaquín Cordero, 89, Mexican actor.
Elmer Diedtrich, 85, American politician, member of South Dakota House of Representatives (1989–1992, 1999–2000) and Senate (2001–2002).
Johnny Downie, 87, Scottish footballer.
Hans Ernback, 70, Swedish actor.
Justus Esiri, 70, Nigerian actor, complications of diabetes.
Gerhard Frey, 80, German financier and politician, Chairman of the German People's Union (1971–2009).
Börje Jeppsson, 84, Swedish Olympic weightlifter.
M. Hasan Ali Khan, 63, Bangladeshi naval officer, Chief of Naval Staff (2005–2007).
Elisa Lam, 21, Canadian student, accidental drowning, (body discovered on this date).
Radhakishan Malviya, 69, Indian politician.
Lou Myers, 77, American actor (The Wedding Planner, A Different World), complications from pneumonia. 
Jon Odlum, 76, Saint Lucian politician.
*Park Chul-soo, 64, South Korean film director, traffic collision.
Robert Coleman Richardson, 75, American physicist, winner of Nobel Prize for Physics (1996), complications following heart attack.
Donald Richie, 88, American-born Japanese film critic and cinematic author.
G. Ross Roy, 88, Scottish literature scholar.
Hubert Schieth, 86, German football player and manager.
Mickey Stubblefield, 86, American baseball player (Kansas City Monarchs).
Pedro Lisímaco de Jesús Vílchez Vílchez, 83, Nicaraguan Roman Catholic prelate, Bishop of Jinotega (1982–2005).
Eugene Whelan, 88, Canadian politician, MP for Essex South (1962–1968), for Essex (1968–1984), Senator for SW Ontario (1996–1999), stroke complications.
Martin Wilk, 90, Canadian statistician. 
Chip Woodrum, 74, American politician, member of the Virginia General Assembly for Roanoke (1980–2003).
Jane C. Wright, 93, American oncologist.

20
Avraham Brandwein, 67, Israeli rabbi.
 Kenji Eno, 42, Japanese video game developer (D), heart failure.
Jean Gauthier, 75, Canadian ice hockey player (Montreal Canadiens, Philadelphia Flyers, Boston Bruins).
Brima George, ?, Sierra Leonean footballer
John Finbarr Jones, 83, Irish–born American academic.
William Letwin, 90, Anglo-American academic.
Emma McDougall, 21, English footballer (Blackburn Rovers L.F.C.), cancer.
David S. McKay, 77, American astrobiologist (NASA).
Antonio Roma, 80, Argentine footballer.
Rex Scouten, 88, American civil servant, White House Chief Usher (1969–1986), White House Office of the Curator (1986–1997).
Yussef Suleiman, 26, Syrian footballer (Al-Wathba SC), mortar attack.
Ozzie Sweet, 94, American film actor and sports photographer.
Osmo Antero Wiio, 85, Finnish academic and politician, MP (1975–1979).
Neil Wilson, 77, American baseball player.

21
John Clappison, 75, English ceramic and glass designer.
Scott Clark, 43, American comic book artist (X-Men, Martian Manhunter, Deathstroke).
Raymond Cusick, 84, British TV designer (Doctor Who), heart failure.
Norbert Dorsey, 83, American Roman Catholic prelate, Bishop of Orlando (1990–2004), cancer.
Patrick Ellis, 84, American academic, President of La Salle University (1977–1992) and CUA (1992–1998).
Nazem Ganjapour, 69, Iranian footballer. 
Aleksei Yuryevich German, 74, Russian filmmaker.
Bob Godfrey, 91, British animator (Henry's Cat, Roobarb) and Academy Award-winning (1975) short film maker (Great).
Willi Gutmann, 85, Swiss sculptor.
Hasse Jeppson, 87, Swedish footballer.
Masahiro Kanagawa, 29, Japanese criminal, execution by hanging.
Kaoru Kobayashi, 44, Japanese criminal, execution by hanging.
Francisco José Madero González, 82, Mexican politician, Governor of Coahuila (1981).
Magic Slim, 75, American blues singer and guitarist.
Bruce Millan, 85, Scottish politician, Secretary of State for Scotland (1976–1979), European Commissioner for Regional Policy (1989–1995), bronchopneumonia.
Dick Neal, Jr., 79, English footballer.
Louis F. Oberdorfer, 94, American senior judge, United States District Court for the District of Columbia (1977–2013), natural causes.
Glenn K. Otis, 83, American army general.
Filoteo Samaniego, 84, Ecuadorian translator and diplomat.
Yuriy Shulyatytskyi, 70, Ukrainian football coach.
Cleotha Staples, 78, American gospel singer (The Staple Singers), member of the Rock and Roll Hall of Fame, Alzheimer's disease.
Del Tenney, 82, American actor and film director. 
Tom Tipps, 90, American politician, member of the Oklahoma House of Representatives (1952–1954) and Senate (1954–1962).
T. G. Venkatraman, 82, Indian politician.
Merlin Volzke, 87, American jockey and racing official.
Zheng Cao, 46, Chinese opera singer, lung cancer.

22
Debi Austin, 62, American anti-smoking advocate, cancer.
Shu-Park Chan, 83, Chinese–born American academic, founded International Technological University.  
P. Chuba Chang, 47, Indian politician, MLA for Tuensang Sadar-II (1998–2013).
Bob Corbin, 90, American politician, member of the Ohio House of Representatives (1976–2000).
Hans Hallén, 77, Swedish Olympic bobsledder.
George Ives, 87, American actor (Bewitched, Green Acres, Perry Mason).
Ava June, 81, British opera singer.
Atje Keulen-Deelstra, 74, Dutch quadruple world champion, Olympic silver and bronze medallist (all 1972), world record holder speed skater, cerebral infarction.
Neil Mann, 88, Australian VFL football player and coach (Collingwood).
Jean-Louis Michon, 88, French academic.
Claude Monteux, 92, American flautist and conductor.
Enver Ören, 74, Turkish businessman, renal failure.
Mario Ramírez, 55, Puerto Rican baseball player (New York Mets, San Diego Padres).
Wolfgang Sawallisch, 89, German conductor and pianist. 
Hari Shankar Singhania, 79, Indian industrialist.
Behsat Üvez, 53, Turkish singer and composer, lung cancer.

23
Viljo Aho, 80, Finnish Olympic boxer.
José Gustavo Angel Ramírez, 78, Colombian Roman Catholic prelate, Vicar Apostolic of Mitú (1989–2009).
Benedict Ashley, 97, American theologian and philosopher.
Eugene Bookhammer, 94, American politician, Lieutenant Governor of Delaware (1969–1977).
Joan Child, 91, Australian politician, MP for Henty (1974–1975, 1980–1990), first female Speaker of House of Representatives (1986–1989).
Jack Choquette, 84, American stock car racing driver.
Joseph Friedenson, 90, Holocaust survivor, Holocaust historian, Yiddish writer, lecturer and editor.
Nigel Glendinning, 83, British art historian.
Donald A. Haggar, 88, American politician, member of the South Dakota House of Representatives (1959–1960).
George A. Hamid, Jr., 94, American entertainment businessman.
Michael Inchbald, 92, British architectural and interior designer.
Howard Liddell, 67, British architect, cancer.
Paul C. P. McIlhenny, 68, American businessman, CEO of Tabasco, heart attack.
Mary Ann McMorrow, 83, American judge, first female judge for Supreme Court of Illinois (1992–2006); first female Chief Justice (2002–2005).
Julien Ries, 92, Belgian Roman Catholic prelate, Cardinal of Sant'Antonio di Padova a Circonvallazione Appia (since 2012).
Maurice Rosy, 85, Belgian comics writer.
Sonny Russo, 83, American jazz trombonist.
Lotika Sarkar, 90, Indian academic.
Sylvia Smith, 67, British writer, pulmonary disease.
Sir Richard Worsley, 89, British Army general.

24
Roy Brown Jr., 96, American car design engineer (Edsel, Ford Consul, Ford Cortina), complications of Parkinson's disease and pneumonia.
Dave Charlton, 76, British-born South African racing driver. 
John Driftmier, 30, Canadian television director, plane crash.
Paul Enock, 78, Canadian Olympic speed skater.
Sir Denis Forman, 95, British television executive, Chairman of Granada Television (1974–1987).
Ralph Hotere, 81, New Zealand artist, pneumonia.
Farideh Lashai, 68, Iranian contemporary artist, cancer.
Con Martin, 89, Irish Gaelic and association football player.
Alexis Nihon, Jr., 67, Canadian real estate businessman, Olympic wrestler for The Bahamas (1968), cancer.
Andrew Nisbet, Jr., 91, American politician and military officer, member of the Washington House of Representatives (1978–1982).
Seamus O'Connell, 83, English footballer.
Frank Joseph Polozola, 71, American senior (former chief) judge, US District Court for Middle Louisiana (1980–2013), cancer.
Mahmoud Salem, 82, Egyptian author, cardiac dysfunction.
Tjokorda Ngurah Wim Sukawati, 90, Indonesian Balinese royal and diplomat.
Dick Yelvington, 84, American football player (New York Giants), 1956 NFL Champions.

25
Abdelhamid Abou Zeid, 47–48, Algerian al-Qaeda commander, military action.
Allan B. Calhamer, 81, American boardgame inventor (Diplomacy).
Arnold Coates, 76, English footballer.
William J. Duffy, 96, American jurist and politician.
Herb Epp, 78, Canadian politician, MPP of the Ontario Legislature for Waterloo North (1977–1990).
Stewart "Dirk" Fischer, 88, American jazz musician and composer.
Claudis James, 69, American football player.
Samuel Kivuitu, 74, Kenyan election official and politician, MP for Parklands (1969–1974, 1983–1988), throat cancer.
C. Everett Koop, 96, American pediatric surgeon and public health administrator, Surgeon General of the United States (1982–1989).
Phillip Leishman, 61, New Zealand broadcaster, brain tumour.
Lennart Lindgren, 93, Swedish Navy captain.
Doris Lorenz-Müller, 78, German Olympic athlete.
Ralph P. Martin, 87, British New Testament scholar.
Carmen Montejo, 87, Cuban-born Mexican actress.
Ray O'Connor, 86, Australian politician, Premier of Western Australia (1982–1983).
Willy Rizzo, 84, Italian-born French news and celebrity photographer (Paris Match), and furniture designer.
Heikki Siren, 94, Finnish architect.
Dan Toler, 64, American musician (Allman Brothers Band), amyotrophic lateral sclerosis.
Milan Velimirović, 60, Serbian chess problemist and publisher.

26
Marie-Claire Alain, 86, French organist.
Randolph Bromery, 87, American educator, Chancellor of the University of Massachusetts Amherst (1971–1979).
Harold G. Clarke, 85, American judge, member of the Georgia Supreme Court (1979–1994), Chief Justice (1990–1994).
Giovanni D'Ascenzi, 93, Italian Roman Catholic prelate, Bishop of Sovana–Pitigliano–Orbetello (1975–1981) and Arezzo–Cortona–Sansepolcro (1981–1996).
Donald R. Deskins, Jr., 80, American football player (Oakland Raiders), geographer and sociologist.
Timothy Donaldson, 79, Bahamian banker, first Governor of the Central Bank (1974–1980), Ambassador to the United States, cancer.
Ronald Edwards, 95, South African cricketer.
James Ferguson, 87, Canadian politician.
Jan Howard Finder, 73, American science fiction writer, renal and liver failure. 
Bert Flugelman, 90, Australian sculptor, complications from polio.
Tom Griffin, 96, American aviator, member of the Doolittle Raid.
Herbie Hall, 86, British Olympic wrestler.
Stéphane Hessel, 95, German-born French author and diplomat, member of the French Resistance, survivor of Buchenwald, Mittelbau-Dora and Bergen-Belsen.
Adrian Hollis, 72, English correspondence chess grandmaster. 
Huỳnh Văn Cao, 85, Vietnamese politician and major general (Army of the Republic of Vietnam).
Simon Li, 90, Hong Kong judge and politician.
Marco McMillian, 33, American businessman and political candidate, homicide.
William Perehudoff, 94, Canadian painter.
Maya Jackson Randall, 33, American financial journalist (The Wall Street Journal), leukemia.
Eugene P. Sheehy, 90, American academic librarian.
Kaoru Shimamura, 43, Japanese voice actress, breast cancer.
Sung Chan-gyeong, 82, South Korean poet.
Donald Thompson, 85, American Olympic fencer and academic.
Dobrivoje Trivić, 69, Serbian footballer (FK Vojvodina, Toulouse FC, Olympique Lyonnais).

27
María Asquerino, 87, Spanish film actress, respiratory failure.
Henri Caillavet, 99, French politician, gay rights and pro-choice advocate, Senator (1967–1983), MEP (1979–1984).
Van Cliburn, 78, American pianist, bone cancer.
Ramon Dekkers, 43, Dutch kickboxer, eight-time Muay Thai world champion, myocardial infarction.
David Dewaele, 36, French actor, stroke.
Robin M. Hochstrasser, 82, Scottish–born American chemist. 
Doreen Kimura, 80, Canadian psychologist. 
Molly Lefebure, 93, British writer. 
Low Meng Tak, 90–91, Chinese Malaysian businessman and philanthropist, leukemia.
Mike Marienthal, 89, American football player and coach (UCLA). 
Walter Pierce, 93, American architect.
Dale Robertson, 89, American actor (Death Valley Days, Tales of Wells Fargo, Dynasty), lung cancer and pneumonia.
Jim Starrak, 84, American ice-hockey player.
Richard Street, 70, American singer (The Monitors, The Temptations), pulmonary embolism.
Roy Stuart, 92, American football player.
Terry Twell, 66, English footballer.
Adolfo Zaldívar, 69, Chilean politician and lawyer, Senator (1994–2010), President of the Senate (2008–2009), Ambassador to Argentina (since 2010), pancreatic cancer.
Imants Ziedonis, 79, Latvian poet, natural causes.

28
DJ Ajax, 41, Australian DJ, traffic collision.
Clarence Atwell Jr., 67, American Tachi Yokuts tribal leader (1967–2009), cancer.
Theo Bos, 47, Dutch football player and coach, pancreatic cancer.
William Bennett, 56, American oboist (San Francisco Symphony), cerebral hemorrhage.
Pedro Treto Cisneros, 73, Mexican baseball commissioner.
Nancy Cooke de Herrera, 90, American socialite and author.
Daniel Darc, 53, French singer (Taxi Girl), drug overdose.
Yo-Yo Davalillo, 81, Venezuelan baseball player (Washington Senators).
Mosese Fotuaika, 20, New Zealand rugby league player (Wests Tigers), suicide. 
Donald A. Glaser, 86, American physicist and neurobiologist, Nobel Prize in Physics (1960).
Jean Marcel Honoré, 92, French Roman Catholic prelate, Cardinal of Santa Maria della Salute a Primavalle, Archbishop of Tours (1981–1997).
Neil McCorkell, 100, English cricketer.
Moon Mullen, 96, American baseball (Philadelphia Phillies) and basketball player (University of Oregon).
Bruce Reynolds, 81, British criminal, mastermind of the Great Train Robbery.
Armando Trovajoli, 95, Italian film composer and pianist.
Jean Van Steen, 83, Belgian footballer.
Yulian Voronovskyi, 76, Ukrainian Catholic hierarch, Bishop of Ukrainian Catholic Eparchy of Sambir – Drohobych (1993–2011).
Robert Weimar, 80, German academic.

References

2013-02
 02